The Times-Record is a weekly newspaper based in Fayette, Alabama, and owned by Times Record LLC. It covers the news of Fayette County, AL.
Official website

Newspapers published in Alabama